Florida's 4th congressional district is a congressional district in northeastern Florida, encompassing Nassau and parts of Duval and St. Johns counties. The district is currently represented by Republican Aaron Bean. 

As part of the 2020 redistricting cycle, the district was redrawn to include Clay County and exclude St. Johns County. Rutherford was redistricted into the 5th district, and Republican state senator Aaron Bean was elected to be the district's representative in the 2022 election.

History
Before 1993, most of the territory now in the 4th district was the 3rd district, represented by Democrat Charles Edward Bennett. He had held the seat and its predecessors since 1949 and was facing a stiff reelection contest against Republican Tillie K. Fowler in the 1992. Bennett retired after his wife fell ill, and Fowler easily defeated an underfunded replacement candidate.  She became the first Republican woman to represent the district.

From 1967 to 1993, the 4th district stretched from the southern Jacksonville suburbs to the northern Orlando suburbs. Much of this area became the 7th District after redistricting, and is now the 6th District.

Voting

Voter registration

List of members representing the district

Election results

2002

2004

2006

2008

2010

2012

2014

2016

2018

2020

2022

Historical district boundaries

References
Specific

General

 Congressional Biographical Directory of the United States 1774–present

External links
Rep. Ander Crenshaw's official House of Representatives website

04
1913 establishments in Florida